James Whitcomb Riley House may refer to:

James Whitcomb Riley Museum Home, the author's adult home
Riley Birthplace and Museum, the author's childhood home